Lidköping IF was a Swedish football club located in Lidköping which in 2012 merged with IF Heimer and created Lidköpings FK.

Sport in Lidköping
Football clubs in Västra Götaland County
1968 establishments in Sweden
Association football clubs established in 1968